The following is a list of the players who have collected the most rebounds during their WNBA careers.

All statistics are up to date as of the close of the 2022 WNBA season.

Progressive list of rebounding leaders
This is a progressive list of rebounding leaders showing how the record increased through the years.
Statistics accurate as of August 18, 2022.

Notes

References

External links
Updated list

Lists of Women's National Basketball Association players
Women's National Basketball Association statistics